Saint Helena is a British overseas territory located in the South Atlantic Ocean. It is one of three constituent parts of the British Overseas Territory of Saint Helena, Ascension and Tristan da Cunha.

It was named after Helena, mother of Constantine I. It is one of the most remote islands in the world and was uninhabited when discovered by the Portuguese enroute to the Indian subcontinent in 1502. For about four centuries the island was an important stopover for ships from Europe to Asia and back, while sailing around the African continent, until the opening of the Suez canal. St Helena is the United Kingdom's second-oldest overseas territory after Bermuda. 

Saint Helena is known for being the site of Napoleon's second exile, following his final defeat in 1815.

History

Early history (1502–1658)
By long tradition the island was sighted on 21 May 1502 by the four ships of the 3rd Portuguese Armada commanded by Galician navigator João da Nova during the return voyage to Lisbon, and that he named it Santa Helena after Saint Helena of Constantinople. This tradition has been reviewed by a 2022 paper which concluded the Portuguese chronicles published at least 50 years later, are the sole primary source to the discovery. Although contradictory in describing other events, these chronicles almost unanimously claim João da Nova found St Helena sometime in 1502, although none quote the precise date. 

However, there are several reasons for doubting da Nova made this discovery. First, given that da Nova either returned on 11 September or 13 September 1502 it is usually assumed the Cantino planisphere completed by the following November includes his discovery of Ascension Island (shown as an archipelago with one of six islands marked as “ilha achada e chamada Ascenssam”), yet this map fails to show St Helena. Second, when a section of the Fourth Armada under the command of Estêvão da Gama sighted and landed at St Helena the following year on 30 July 1503 its scrivener Thomé Lopes regarded it as an unknown island yet named Ascension as one of five reference points to the new island’s location. On 12 July 1503, nearly three weeks before reaching St Helena, Lopes described how Estêvão da Gama’s ships met up with a section of the Fifth Armada led by Afonso de Albuquerque off the Cape of Good Hope. The latter left Lisbon about six months after João da Nova’s return so Albuquerque and his captains should all have known whether João da Nova had indeed found St Helena. An anonymous Flemish traveler on one of da Gama's ships reporting that bread and victuals were running short by the time they reached the Cape, so from da Gama's perspective there was a pressing need that he be told water and meat could be found at St Helena. The fact that nothing seems to have been said about the island, da Gama's scrivener Lopes regarding the island as unknown, again implies da Nova found Ascension but not St Helena. The 2022 paper also reviews cartographic evidence that St Helena and Ascension were known to the Spanish in 1500, before either João da Nova or Estêvão da Gama sailed for India. The suggestion that João da Nova discovered Tristan da Cunha naming it St Helena is discounted.

A 2015 paper notes that 21 May is the Orthodox and Protestant feast day, opposing the Catholic one in August, and the day and the month was first quoted in 1596 by Jan Huyghen van Linschoten, who was probably mistaken because the island was discovered several decades before the Reformation and the start of Huyghen's faith of Protestantism. An alternative discovery date of 3 May is suggested as being historically more credible; it is the Catholic feast day of the finding of the True Cross by Saint Helena in Jerusalem, and cited by Odoardo Duarte Lopes and Sir Thomas Herbert.

When Linschoten arrived on 12 May 1589 he reported seeing carvings made by visiting seamen on a fig tree that were dated as early as 1510. The Portuguese probably planted saplings rather than mature trees, and for these to be sufficiently large by 1510 to carry carvings suggests the plants were shipped to the island and planted there some years earlier, possibly within a few years of discovery.

A third discovery story, told by the 16th-century historian Gaspar Correia, holds that the island was found by the Portuguese nobleman and warrior Dom Garcia de Noronha, who sighted the island on his way to India in late 1511 or early 1512. His pilots entered the island onto their charts and it has been suggested that this event was likely decisive in leading to the utilisation of the island as a regular stopover for rest and replenishment for ships en route from India to Europe, from that date until well into the seventeenth century. An analysis has been published of the Portuguese ships arriving at St Helena in the period 1502–1613.

The Portuguese found the island uninhabited, with an abundance of trees and fresh water. They imported livestock, fruit trees and vegetables, and built a chapel and one or two houses. The long tradition that João da Nova built a chapel from one of his wrecked carracks has been shown to be based on a misreading of the records. They formed no permanent settlement, but the island was an important rendezvous point and source of food for ships travelling by Cape Route from Asia to Europe, and frequently sick mariners were left on the island to recover before taking passage on the next ship to call at the island.

Englishman Sir Francis Drake probably located the island on the final leg of his circumnavigation of the world (1577–1580). Further visits by other English explorers followed and, once Saint Helena's location was more widely known, English ships of war began to lie in wait in the area to attack Portuguese India carracks on their way home.

In developing their Far East trade, the Dutch also began to frequent the island. The Portuguese and Spanish soon gave up regularly calling at the island, partly because they used ports along the West African coast, but also because of attacks on their shipping, the desecration of their chapel and religious icons, killings of their livestock, and destruction of their plantations by Dutch pirates.

The Dutch Republic formally claimed Saint Helena in 1633, although there is no evidence that they ever occupied it. The Dutch lost interest in the island after establishing their colony at the Cape of Good Hope.

East India Company (1658–1815)

In 1657, Oliver Cromwell granted the East India Company (EIC) a charter to govern Saint Helena and, the following year, the company decided to fortify the island and settle it with planters. A tradition, which had its origins in the early 20th century, that the early settlers included many who had lost their homes in the 1666 Great Fire of London, was shown to be a myth in 1999.

The first governor, Captain John Dutton, arrived in 1659, making Saint Helena one of Britain's earliest colonies outside North America and the Caribbean. A fort and houses were built: Jamestown had been founded, "in the narrow valley between steep cliffs".

After the Restoration of the English monarchy in 1660, the East India Company received a royal charter, giving it the sole right to fortify and colonise the island. The fort was renamed James Fort and the town was called Jamestown, in honour of the Duke of York, later King James II.

Between January and May 1673, the Dutch East India Company seized the island, but English reinforcements restored East India Company control. The island was fortified with approximately 230 gun turrets.

The British government sent some settlers and gave them land that they could farm but the company experienced difficulty attracting an adequate number of immigrants, in spite of advertisements in London and free tracts of land. By 1670, the population was only 66, including slaves. There was also unrest and rebellion among the inhabitants. Ecological problems, such as deforestation, soil erosion, vermin and drought, led Governor Isaac Pyke to suggest in 1715 that the population be moved to Mauritius, but that was not acted upon. The company continued to subsidise the community because of the island's strategic location. A census in 1723 recorded 1,110 inhabitants, including 610 slaves.
 
In the peak era, a thousand ships per year stopped there leaving the governor to try to police the numerous visitors and to limit the consumption of arrack, made from potatoes. Two mutinies occurred, perhaps fueled by alcohol. Because Jamestown was "too raucous with its taverns and brothels", St Paul's Cathedral was built outside the town.

Eighteenth-century governors tried to tackle the island's problems by planting trees, improving fortifications, eliminating corruption, building a hospital, tackling the neglect of crops and livestock, controlling the consumption of alcohol, and introducing legal reforms. The island enjoyed a lengthy period of prosperity from about 1770. Captain James Cook visited the island in 1775 on the final leg of his second circumnavigation of the world. St. James' Church was built in Jamestown in 1774, and Plantation House in 1791–1792; the latter has since been the official residence of the Governor.

Edmond Halley visited Saint Helena on leaving the University of Oxford in 1676, and set up an astronomical observatory with a  aerial telescope, intending to study the stars of the Southern Hemisphere. The site of this telescope is near Saint Mathew's Church in Hutt's Gate in the Longwood district. The  hill there is called Halley's Mount.

Throughout that period, Saint Helena was an important port of call of the East India Company. East Indiamen would stop there on the return leg of their voyages to British India and China. At Saint Helena, ships could replenish supplies of water and provisions and, during wartime, form convoys that would sail under the protection of vessels of the Royal Navy.

Captain James Cook's ship  anchored and resupplied off the coast of Saint Helena in May 1771 on its return from the European discovery of the east coast of Australia and the rediscovery of New Zealand.

The importation of slaves was made illegal in 1792. Governor Robert Patton (1802–1807) recommended that the company import workers from China to supplement the rural workforce. Many were allowed to stay, and their descendants became integrated into the population. In 1810, Chinese labourers began arriving, and by 1818, 650 were in St Helena. An 1814 census recorded 3,507 people on the island. Many of the labourers were allowed to stay, even though there was less need for their services by 1836.

British rule (1815–1821) and Napoleon's exile

He was taken to the island in October 1815. Napoleon stayed at the Briars pavilion, on the grounds of the Balcombe family's home, until his permanent residence at Longwood House was completed in December 1815. He died there on 5 May 1821.

British East India Company (1821–1834)
Following Napoleon's death, the soldiers and other temporary residents linked to his presence on the island were withdrawn and the East India Company resumed full control of Saint Helena. Between 1815 and 1830, the EIC made the packet schooner  available to the government of the island, which made multiple trips per year between the island and the Cape, carrying passengers both ways and supplies of wine and provisions back to the island. Napoleon praised Saint Helena's coffee during his exile on the island, and the product enjoyed a brief popularity in Paris in the years after his death.

The importation of slaves to Saint Helena was banned in 1792. In 1818, the governor freed children born of slaves on the island. The phased emancipation of over 800 resident slaves took place in 1827, some six years before the British parliament passed legislation to abolish slavery in the colonies.

Between 1791 and 1833, Saint Helena became the site of a series of experiments in conservation, reforestation, and attempts to boost rainfall artificially. This environmental intervention was closely linked to the conceptualisation of the processes of environmental change and helped establish the roots of environmentalism.

Crown colony (1834–1981)

Under the provisions of the 1833 India Act, control of Saint Helena passed from the East India Company to the British Crown, and it became a crown colony. Subsequent administrative cost-cutting triggered a long-term population decline: those who could afford to do so tended to leave the island for better opportunities elsewhere. The latter half of the 19th century saw the advent of steamships not reliant on trade winds, as well as the diversion of Far East trade away from the traditional South Atlantic shipping lanes to a route via the Red Sea (which, prior to the building of the Suez Canal, involved a short overland section).

In 1840, a British naval station established to suppress the Atlantic slave trade was based on the island, and between 1840 and 1849 over 15,000 freed slaves, known as "Liberated Africans", were landed there.

In 1858, the French emperor Napoleon III purchased, in the name of the French government, Longwood House and the lands around it, the last residence of Napoleon I (who died there in 1821; his remains had been returned to France in 1840.) It is still French property, administered by a French representative and under the authority of the French Ministry of Foreign Affairs.

A 2020 report states that the island's prosperity ended after 1869 when "the Suez Canal shifted trade routes north". A 2019 report explained that "ships no longer needed a stopping point on a longer journey to Europe". The number of ships calling at the island fell from 1,100 in 1855 to only 288 in 1889.

On 11 April 1898 American Joshua Slocum, on his solo round-the-world voyage, arrived at Jamestown. He departed on 20 April 1898 for the final leg of his circumnavigation, having been extended hospitality by the governor, Sir R A Standale. He presented two lectures on his voyage and was invited to Longwood by the French Consular agent.

By the end of 1899, St Helena was connected to London by undersea cable; this allowed for telegraph communication. In 1900 and 1901, over 6,000 Boer prisoners were held on the island, during the Second Anglo-Boer War. A 2019 report states that "no traces remain of the two POW camps", but adds that "the Boer Cemetery is a poignant spot". Among the notables were Piet Cronjé and his wife after their defeat at the Battle of Paardeberg. The resulting population reached an all-time high of 9,850 in 1901. By 1911, however, that had declined to 3,520 people. In 1906, the British government withdrew the garrison; when spending by the soldiers stopped, there was a negative impact on the economy.

A local industry manufacturing fibre from New Zealand flax was successfully re-established in 1907 and generated considerable income during the First World War. Ascension Island was made a dependency of Saint Helena in 1922, and Tristan da Cunha followed in 1938. During the Second World War, the United States built Wideawake airport on Ascension in 1942, but no military use was made of Saint Helena except maintenance of its defences.

Attendance at school became mandatory in 1942, for ages 5 to 15 in 1941 and the government took over control of the education system. The first secondary school opened in 1946. In the same year, the Americans built Wideawake Airfield (RAF Ascension Island) and that project generated numerous jobs for St Helena; the sale of flax for rope also generated revenue for the island. However, the industry declined after 1951 because of transport costs and competition from synthetic fibres. The decision in 1965 by the British Post Office to use synthetic fibres for its mailbags was a further blow, contributing to the closure of the island's flax mills in 1965.

From 1958, the Union Castle shipping line gradually reduced its service calls to the island. Curnow Shipping, based in Avonmouth, replaced the Union-Castle Line mailship service in 1977, using the RMS (Royal Mail Ship) St Helena which was introduced in 1989.

1981 to present

The British Nationality Act 1981 reclassified Saint Helena and the other Crown colonies as British Dependent Territories. For the next 20 years, many could find only low-paid work with the island government, and the only available employment outside Saint Helena was on the Falkland Islands and Ascension Island. The Development and Economic Planning Department (which still operates) was formed in 1988 to contribute to raising the living standards of the people of Saint Helena.

It was not until 1992 that the Commission on Citizenship was established, restoring the islanders' rights including the right of abode. In 2002, the right to British citizenship was restored.

In 1989, Prince Andrew launched the replacement RMS St Helena to serve the island; the vessel was specially built for the Cardiff–Cape Town route and featured a mixed cargo/passenger layout.

The Saint Helena Constitution took effect in 1989 and provided that the island would be governed by a Governor, Commander-in-Chief, and an elected executive and legislative council. In 2002, the British Overseas Territories Act 2002 granted full British citizenship to the islanders and renamed the dependent territories (including Saint Helena) the British Overseas Territories. In 2009, The St Helena, Ascension and Tristan da Cunha Constitution Order 2009 gave all three equal status; the British Overseas Territory was renamed Saint Helena, Ascension and Tristan da Cunha.

In 2021, a ministerial system was introduced in Saint Helena after UK's approval of a constitution amendment.

Geography 

The nearest port on the continent is Moçâmedes in southern Angola; connections to Cape Town, South Africa are used for most shipping needs via the regular ship that serves the island, the MS Helena.

The island is on the same ridge as two other islands in the southern Atlantic, also British territories: Ascension Island, about  due north-west in more equatorial waters, and Tristan da Cunha, which is outside the tropics  to the south. The island, in the Western Hemisphere, has the same longitude as Land's End (west Cornwall, England), and western Spain. For sharing several trading patterns, and climate effect traits, the island is grouped under West Africa/Africa in most projects, committees and papers of the United Nations.

Coastal areas are scattered with vegetation on volcanic rock and are warmer and drier than the centre. In 1996 it became the island's first national park. Much of the island is covered by New Zealand flax, a legacy of former industry, but there are some original trees augmented by plantations, including those of the Millennium Forest project, which was established in 2002 to replant, particularly with indigenous gumwood, part of the lost Great Wood and is now managed by the Saint Helena National Trust.

When the island was discovered, it was covered with unique indigenous vegetation, including a remarkable cabbage tree species. The island's hinterland must have been a dense tropical forest but the coastal areas were probably also quite green. The modern landscape is very different, with widespread bare rock in the lower areas, although inland it is green, mainly due to introduced vegetation. There are no native land mammals, but cattle, cats, dogs, donkeys, goats, mice, rabbits, rats and sheep have been introduced. The dramatic change in landscape must be attributed to these introductions. As a result, the string tree (Acalypha rubrinervis) and the Saint Helena olive (Nesiota elliptica) are now extinct, and many of the other endemic plants are threatened with extinction.

Some 22 named rocks and islets are offshore: Castle Rock, Speery Island, the Needle, Lower Black Rock, Upper Black Rock (South), Bird Island (Southwest), Black Rock, Thompson's Valley Island, Peaked Island, Egg Island, Lady's Chair, Lighter Rock (West), Long Ledge (Northwest), Shore Island, George Island, Rough Rock Island, Flat Rock (East), the Buoys, Sandy Bay Island, the Chimney, White Bird Island and Frightus Rock (Southeast) – all within  of the shore.

The national bird of Saint Helena is the Saint Helena plover, known locally as the wirebird, on account of its wire-like legs. It appears on the coat of arms of Saint Helena and on the flag.

Climate 

The climate of Saint Helena is tropical, marine and mild, tempered by the Benguela Current and trade winds that blow almost continuously. The climate varies noticeably across the island. Temperatures in Jamestown, on the north leeward shore, are in the range  in the summer (January to April) and  during the remainder of the year. The temperatures in the central areas are, on average,  lower. Jamestown also has a very low annual rainfall, while  falls per year on the higher ground and the south coast, where it is also noticeably cloudier. There are weather recording stations in the Longwood and Blue Hill districts.

Administrative divisions 

Saint Helena is divided into eight districts, with the majority housing a community centre. The districts also serve as statistical divisions. The island is a single electoral area and elects 12 representatives to the Legislative Council of 15.

The difference between the total population of the Administrative Districts and that recorded in the 2016 Census arises because the census included 183 people on board the RMS St. Helena and 13 people who were on yachts in the harbour.

Population

Demographics 

Saint Helena was first settled by the English in 1659. , the island had a population of 4,897 inhabitants, mainly descended from people from Britain—settlers ("planters") and soldiers—and slaves who were brought there from the beginning of settlement—initially from Africa (the Cape Verde Islands, Gold Coast and west coast of Africa are mentioned in early records), then India and Madagascar. The importation of slaves was made illegal in 1792, thus preventing any further increase in their numbers.

In 1840, Saint Helena became a provisioning station for the British West Africa Squadron, preventing the transportation of slaves to Brazil (mainly), and many thousands of slaves were freed on the island. These were all African, and about 500 stayed while the rest were sent on to the West Indies and Cape Town, and eventually to Sierra Leone.

Imported Chinese labourers arrived in 1810, reaching a peak of 618 in 1818, after which numbers were reduced. Only a few older men remained after the British Crown took over the government of the island from the East India Company in 1834. The majority were sent back to China, although records in the Cape suggest that they never got any farther than Cape Town. There were also a few Indian lascars who worked under the harbour master.

The citizens of Saint Helena hold British Overseas Territories citizenship. On 21 May 2002, full British citizenship was restored by the British Overseas Territories Act 2002. See also British nationality law.

During periods of unemployment, there has been a long pattern of emigration from the island since the post-Napoleonic period. The majority of "Saints" emigrated to Britain, South Africa and in the early years, Australia. The population had been steadily declining since the late 1980s and dropped from 5,157 at the 1998 census to 4,257 in 2008. However, as of the 2021 census, the population has risen to 4,439 a drop of 95 people from 2016. In the past emigration was characterised by young unaccompanied persons leaving to work on long-term contracts on Ascension and the Falkland Islands, but since "Saints" were re-awarded British citizenship in 2002, emigration to Britain by a wider range of wage-earners has accelerated due to the prospect of higher wages and better progression prospects. By 2018 Swindon, Wiltshire, had a concentration of people originating from Saint Helena, and therefore it got the nickname "Swindolena".

Religion 
Most residents are Anglican and are members of the Diocese of St Helena, which has its own bishop and includes Ascension Island. The 150th anniversary of the diocese was celebrated in June 2009.

Other Christian denominations on the island include the Roman Catholic (since 1852), the Salvation Army (since 1884), Baptist (since 1845) and, in more recent times, the Seventh-day Adventist (since 1949), the New Apostolic Church, and Jehovah's Witnesses (of which one in 36 residents is a member, the highest ratio of any country).

The Roman Catholics are pastorally served by the Mission sui iuris of Saint Helena, Ascension and Tristan da Cunha, whose office of ecclesiastical superior is vested in the Apostolic Prefecture of the Falkland Islands.

Government 

Executive authority in Saint Helena is vested in King Charles III and is exercised on his behalf by the Governor of Saint Helena. The Governor is appointed by the King on the advice of the British government. Defence and foreign affairs remain the responsibility of the United Kingdom.

There are 15 seats in the Legislative Council of Saint Helena, a unicameral legislature, in addition to a Speaker and a Deputy Speaker. Twelve of the 15 members are elected in elections held every four years. The three ex officio members are the Chief Secretary, Financial Secretary and Attorney General, currently Susan O'Bey, Dax Richards and Allen Cansick respectively. The Executive Council is presided over by the Governor and consists of three ex officio officers and five elected members of the Legislative Council appointed by the Governor. There is no elected Chief Minister, and the Governor acts as the head of government. In January 2013 it was proposed that the Executive Council would be led by a Chief Councillor who would be elected by the members of the Legislative Council and would nominate the other members of the Executive Council. These proposals were put to a referendum on 23 March 2013 where they were defeated by 158 votes to 42 on a 10% turnout. Another referendum in 2021, however, saw the population approve the changes.

Both Ascension Island and Tristan da Cunha have an Administrator appointed to represent the Governor of Saint Helena.

The island is policed by the Saint Helena Police Service (SHPS). The SHPS is also the primary law enforcement agency for Ascension Island and the archipelago of Tristan da Cunha. Like many other Commonwealth nations, the warranted personnel of the SHPS are known as 'constables', and the service also utilises special constables, in addition to employing non-warranted staff personnel. The SHPS also uses a variety of ranks similar to other Commonwealth law enforcement agencies. Saint Helena has one police station, Coleman House, named after PC Leonard John Coleman who died in the line of duty on 2 December 1982. The Island's only prison—HMP Jamestown—was built in 1827 and in 2018.

One commentator has observed that notwithstanding the high unemployment resulting from the loss of full passports during 1981–2002, the level of loyalty to the British monarchy by the Saint Helena population is probably not exceeded in any other part of the world. King George VI is the only reigning monarch to have visited the island. This was in 1947 when the King, accompanied by Queen Elizabeth (later The Queen Mother), Princess Elizabeth (later Queen Elizabeth II) and Princess Margaret were travelling to South Africa. The Duke of Edinburgh arrived at Saint Helena in 1957, followed by his son, Prince Andrew, who visited as a member of the armed forces in 1984, and his daughter, the Princess Royal, in 2002.

Human rights 
In 2012, the government of Saint Helena funded the creation of the Saint Helena Human Rights Action Plan 2012–2015. Work is being done under this action plan, including publishing awareness-raising articles in local newspapers, providing support for members of the public with human rights queries, and extending several UN Conventions on human rights to St. Helena.

Legislation to set up an Equality and Human Rights Commission was passed by Legislative Council in July 2015. This commenced operation in October 2015.

Child abuse scandal
In 2014, there were reports of child abuse in Saint Helena. Britain's Foreign and Commonwealth Office (FCO) was accused of lying to the United Nations about child abuse in Saint Helena to cover up allegations.

Sasha Wass QC and her team arrived on Saint Helena on 17 March 2015 to commence the Inquiry and departed on 1 April 2015. Announcements were made in local newspapers in week-ending 13 March 2015.

A government report was published on 10 December 2015. It found that the accusations were grossly exaggerated, and the lurid headlines in the Daily Mail had come from information from two social workers, whom the report described as incompetent.

Same-sex marriage
In 2017, a male St Helenian made an application to the Registrar to marry his male fiancé on St Helena. The laws at the time had referred to marriages between men and women and it was not clear whether same-sex marriages were lawful. After consultation events, endorsement by the Social and Community Development Committee and Executive Council, the Marriage Ordinance was updated and agreed by Legislative Council in December 2017. Registrar Karen Yon oversaw the first same-sex wedding between the original 2017 applicants, Saint Helenian Lemarc Thomas and Swedish national Michael Wernstedt, in a ceremony at Plantation House on 31 December 2018.

Reburial of excavated human remains
In 2021, a wreath was placed by the Saint Helena's Equality & Human Rights Commission (EHRC) on the door of the Pipe Store in Jamestown. The Pipe Store is a building where the remains of some 325 people, men, women, and children disinterred during airport construction were being stored pending reburial since 2008. The remains belonged to liberated Africans who had been rescued by the Royal Navy's West Africa Squadron during the suppression of the Atlantic slave trade and brought to Saint Helena.

Biodiversity 
 
Saint Helena has long been known for its high proportion of endemic birds and vascular plants. The highland areas contain most of the 400 endemic species recognised to date. Much of the island has been identified by BirdLife International as being important for bird conservation, especially the endemic Saint Helena plover or wirebird, and for seabirds breeding on the offshore islets and stacks, in the north-east and the south-west Important Bird Areas. On the basis of these endemics and an exceptional range of habitats, Saint Helena is on the United Kingdom's tentative list for future UNESCO World Heritage Sites. Artist Rolf Weijburg produced original etchings of Saint Helena, picturing various species of these endemic birds.

Saint Helena's biodiversity, however, also includes marine vertebrates, invertebrates (freshwater, terrestrial and marine), fungi (including lichen-forming species), non-vascular plants, seaweeds and other biological groups. To date, very little is known about these, although more than 200 lichen-forming fungi have been recorded, including nine endemics, suggesting that many significant discoveries remain to be made.

Various flora and fauna on the island have become extinct. Due to deforestation, the last wild endemic St Helena olive tree, Nesiota elliptica died in 1994, and by December 2003, the last cultivated olive tree died. The native St.Helena earwig was last seen in the wild in 1967.

A large reforestation project has been under way since 2000 in the north-eastern corner of the island, known as the Millennium Forest, to recreate the Great Wood that existed before colonisation.

The island's shoreline is deep and is known to have abundant red crab. In 1991, a crab-fishing vessel, Oman Sea One, which was engaged in potting of crabs, capsized and later sank off the coast of Saint Helena on its way from Ascension Island, losing four crew members.

Economy 

Note: Some of the data in this section have been sourced from the Government of St Helena Sustainable Development Plan

The island had a monocrop economy until 1966, based on the cultivation and processing of New Zealand flax for rope and string.

A 2019 report states that "by the 1970s, a majority of Saints were working abroad and sending money home".

Saint Helena's economy is now developing, but is almost entirely sustained by aid from the British government. The public sector dominates the economy, accounting for about 50% of gross domestic product. However, the commencement of regular air services demonstrates rise in tourism, and the Government is encouraging investment on the Island, as can be shown by their Investment Policy and Strategy and the investment prospectus for potential investors. In 2019, Saint Helena achieved its first-ever "Investment Grade" credit rating, a credit rating of BBB- (stable), from global credit-rating agency Standard & Poors (S&P).

In 2019, the estimated average annual salary was only about 8,000 Saint Helena pounds (about US$10,000.)

Saint Helena's Sustainable Economic Development Plan, 2018–28, was developed using more than six months of local and international consultation in 2017 to 2018. The document represents a 10-year plan to kick-start the economy after Saint Helena established air access and fibre connectivity and moved away from relying purely on tourism for growth, announcing a desire to "increase exports, and decrease imports". The SEDP stated that the island's comparative advantages are its natural resources and geography, its status as a British Overseas Territory, its currency, relatively inexpensive labour and property costs, and low crime. Targeted export growth sectors include tourism, fisheries, coffee, satellite ground stations, remote workers and digital nomads, academia, research and conferences, liquor, wines and beers, ship registry and sailing qualifications, traditional products, honey and honey bees, and its use as a film location. Growth sectors for import substitution include agriculture, timber, bricks, blocks, minerals and rocks, and bottled water.

The tourist industry is heavily based on the promotion of Napoleon's imprisonment as well as nature activities such as scuba diving, swimming with whale sharks, whale watching, bird watching, marine tours, and hiking. A golf course also exists and sportfishing is possible. Several hotels, B&Bs, and self-catering apartments operate on the island. The arrival of tourists is linked to the Saint Helena Airport (and in the past, the arrival and departure schedule of the now-retired RMS St Helena).

Saint Helena produces the most expensive coffee in the world. It also produces and exports Tungi Spirit, made from the fruit of the prickly or cactus pears, Opuntia ficus-indica ("Tungi" is the local Saint Helenian name for the plant), and coffee liqueur, gin, and rum in its local distillery. Due to the absence of parasites and disease in bees, beekeepers collect some of the purest honey in the world.

Saint Helena has a small fishing industry, landing mostly tuna. The fishery is committed to one-by-one fishing and uses the motto "one pole, one line, one fish at a time". Some of Saint Helena's exported tuna has been served in restaurants in Cape Town.

Like Ascension Island and Tristan da Cunha, Saint Helena is permitted to issue its own postage stamps, an enterprise that provides an income. Saint Helena also issues domains under .sh.

Economic statistics
Between 2009 and 2017, Saint Helena's HDI increased from 0.714 to 0.756; this placed Saint Helena in the 'high' category of human development, according to the classification used by the United Nations. Compared to other countries around the globe, Saint Helena's HDI ranking rose from 93rd (out of 190 countries ranked) to 83rd in the world—an improvement of ten places.

The average (median) annual wage on Saint Helena in 2018/19 was an estimated £8,410. The median male wage was higher than the median female wage. The gap between the two grew in 2013/14, but narrowed in 2017–18, as male wages fell on average, and the median female wage level grew. This is probably due to the completion of the construction of the airport, since workers employed on the project were predominantly male, and many of them either left Saint Helena or found alternative employment between 2016-2018. Nonetheless, both female and male median wage levels fell sharply in 2018/19.

The overall retail price index is measured quarterly on Saint Helena by the SHG Statistics Office. The RPI was measured at 105.9 in the first quarter of 2020. This is unchanged from the rate of the fourth quarter of 2019, and an increase from 104.1 in the first quarter of 2019. This means that retail prices rose, on average, by 1.7% over the past year, between the first quarter of 2019 and the first quarter of 2020. As most of the goods available in retail outlets on Saint Helena are imported from either South Africa or the United Kingdom, Saint Helena's prices are heavily influenced by price inflation in those two countries, the value of the Saint Helena pound compared to the South African rand, the cost of freight, and import taxes. In the UK, the annual price inflation rate (using the consumer price index) was 1.7% for February 2020, down from 1.8% in January 2020. In South Africa, the consumer price index was 4.6% for February, up from 4.5% in January 2020. In addition, since early 2019 the value of the South African Rand has steadily weakened, from around 17 Rand per pound to around 20 at the end of March 2020; this has a counter effect to the South African inflation, and in some cases may even have made South African goods cheaper to buy. This will mitigate against some pressures which might cause prices to rise, such as increasing freight prices on the MV Helena.

Between January 2010 and March 2016, just before the first 40 people arrived by air in April 2016, the average number of arrivals per month by sea (excluding day visitors arriving on cruise ships) was 307, with an average of 245 arriving on the Royal Mail Ship (RMS) Saint Helena. Between October 2017 (when the first scheduled air service began) and September 2019, an average of 432 passengers arrived per month, with 314 of those passengers arriving by air. Since October 2017, a total of 3,337 people have arrived by air in the first 12-month period, and 4,188 in the second. The increase in the second year follows the introduction of a mid-week flight during the peak period of December 2018 to April 2019. Arrivals by air were higher in the second year, in every month, apart from May and June.

Banking and currency

In 1821, Saul Solomon (the uncle of Saul Solomon) issued 70,560 copper tokens worth a halfpenny each Payable at St Helena by Solomon, Dickson and Taylor—presumably London partners—that circulated alongside the East India Company's local coinage until the Crown took over the island in 1836. The coin remains readily available to collectors.

Saint Helena has its own currency since 1976, the Saint Helena pound, which is at parity with the pound sterling and is also the currency of Ascension Island. The government of Saint Helena produces its own coinage, banknotes since 1976 and circulation coins since 1984. Whereas circulating coins are struck with "Saint Helena • Ascension", the banknotes only say "Government of St. Helena". There are also commemorative coins struck for Saint Helena only.

The Bank of Saint Helena was established on Saint Helena and Ascension Island in 2004. It has branches in Jamestown on Saint Helena, and Georgetown, Ascension Island. The bank took over the business of the Saint Helena government savings bank and Ascension Island Savings Bank.

For more information on currency in the wider region, see British currency in the South Atlantic and the Antarctic.

Tourism
Before the completion of the airport, the primary tourist groups were dedicated hikers and retirees, as the required ship voyage on the RMS St Helena took five days, each way. That was unattractive to most tourists with regular jobs. The hikers seemed willing to use the extra days of leave to get to and from Saint Helena, and retirees would not be concerned with voyage times.

The decision to build the airport, in order to significantly boost tourism, was taken in 2011 by the governments of Saint Helena and the UK. Construction was completed by 2016. One reason for the delay was that the British decided to fill in a valley "with some 800 million pounds of dirt and rock" to create flat land for the runway. The first flight did not arrive until October 2017, because of "dangerous wind conditions" that made landing large aircraft unsafe. The solution was to use smaller aircraft, to make the five- or six-hour flight from South Africa. Challenges still exist due to the winds; "only a special, stripped-down Embraer 190 jet with the best pilots in the world can stick the landing". The government's long-term goal is to get 30,000 visitors per year. Because of the few flights, and limited capacity of the aircraft, however, only 894 visitors arrived in the year the airport finally opened.

Passenger service on the Royal Mail ship was then discontinued. The Airlink flights, operating twice a week, increased the island's potential to attract a broader range of tourists.

St Helena Tourism updated its tourism marketing strategy in 2018. This outlined the targeted markets and Saint Helena's strengths, weaknesses, opportunities, and threats. It also outlined the unique selling points of the island, including nature (whale sharks and wirebirds), Saint culture (safer environment), walking and hiking, diving, arts and crafts, twin destination with South Africa, photography, running, history and heritage (Napoleon), stargazing, and food and drink.

The island's first luxury hotel, the Mantis in Jamestown, opened in 2017 in the converted "former officers barracks built in 1774" according to Condé Nast Traveler. Most other types of accommodations were also available on the island.

A 2019 report by The Guardian recommended that tourists visit "Longwood House, where Napoleon was exiled after Waterloo ... Plantation House, the residence of the governor" and to try one of the whale shark snorkelling expeditions. The report spoke highly of Jamestown, with its "pastel-toned houses, sweltering palm trees and colonial relics—stark reminders of imperialist ideals". Another 2019 report indicated that smartphones had become common, "with the 'Saint Memes' Facebook page and other social media exporting their sharp sense of humour". But, as the report concludes, the island "remains a place with an anchor in the past, where ... there are single-digit car licence plates and motorists on the hairpin roads unfailingly wave at each other".

Before the lockdowns and restriction necessitated by the COVID-19 global pandemic, Saint Helena has been on track to meet its tourism targets of 12% growth a year, in order to achieve over 29,000 leisure visitors by the 25th anniversary of the air service.

As of April 2020, research indicated that arrivals to Saint Helena were primarily non-Saint tourists (without a connection to the island), followed by returning Saints (who were visiting friends and relatives), followed by returning residents and then business arrivals. Non-Saint tourists tend to stay for a week, whilst Saints visiting friends and relatives tend to stay for about a month. Around 37% of tourists are British, 21% South African, 13% European other than British, German or French and 9% American or from the Caribbean. Most non-Saint tourists are over 40 years of age, with around 40% being 40 to 59 and around 40% being 60-plus. In 2018 tourism contributed approximately £4–5 million to the economy, and in 2019 this increased to around £5–6 million.

Effects of the pandemic
One news report in August 2020 stated that the costs imposed by the pandemic led to the "collapse of the island's tourism sector, which was meant to drive its economic development".

In 2021, the bicentennial anniversary of Napoleon's death was expected to boost tourism if the pandemic did not prevent visits for many months. As of September 2020, the government was preparing a "tourism recovery strategy", to include an international publicity campaign and the development of further tourism infrastructure for the island".

As of 30 October 2020, the Government website stated that "due to the COVID-19 pandemic, travel to Saint Helena will only be permitted for limited purposes at this time". An item posted on 4 March 2021 on the UK Government website stated that "all arrivals to St Helena are required to have had a negative COVID-19 test within 72 hours before travelling" and with a few exceptions, non-Saints were not allowed to visit. As well, all arrivals were required to self-quarantine for 14 days after landing in Saint Helena.

As of 8 August 2022, the Government website stated that "St Helena lifted its COVID-19 entry regulations. This means no quarantine, no testing and no mask-wearing requirements".

Transport 

Saint Helena is one of the most remote islands in the world. It has one commercial airport, and the island has become somewhat more accessible since air traffic opened in 2017.

Sea
A freight ship, M/V Helena, handles all freight to the island (some express mail is transported by air). It sails from Cape Town to Saint Helena and Ascension Island, from the beginning of 2018. It uses a wharf at Ruperts Bay which was built to assist the airport construction. It can take a few passengers.

Until 2017, the Royal Mail Ship  ran between Saint Helena and Cape Town on a five-day voyage, then the only scheduled connection to the island. She berthed offshore in James Bay, Saint Helena, approximately 30 times per year, and passengers and freight were transferred by small boats ashore. AW Ship Management had a package deal where passengers could travel in one direction on the St Helena and in the other by taking British Royal Air Force flights to or from RAF Ascension Island and RAF Brize Norton in Brize Norton, England.

Saint Helena receives around 600 yachting visitors a year. During 2020, as a result of the COVID-19 pandemic, it was advised that yachting passengers should not leave port to travel to Saint Helena; however, those seeking entry on humanitarian grounds can be granted entry after two weeks' quarantine in port in James Bay.

Air

In March 2005, the British government announced plans to construct the Saint Helena Airport. On 22 July 2010, the British government agreed to help pay for the new airport. In November 2011, a deal was signed between the British government and South African civil engineering company Basil Read, and the airport was scheduled to open in February 2016 with flights to and from South Africa and the UK. The cost was £250 million. This is aimed at helping the island become more self-sufficient, encouraging economic development while reducing dependence on British government aid. It is also expected to kick-start the tourism industry, with up to 30,000 visitors expected annually.

The first aircraft landed at the new airport on 15 September 2015, a South African Beechcraft King Air 200, prior to conducting a series of flights to calibrate the airport's radio navigation equipment.
The airport's opening was scheduled for May 2016, but it was announced in June 2016 that it had been delayed due to uncertainty about the impact of high winds and wind shear. In 2017, South African airline Airlink became the preferred bidder to provide weekly air service between the island and Johannesburg.
The first commercial flight ever to land at Saint Helena was a charter flight carried out by Airlink of South Africa on Wednesday, 3 May 2017 from Cape Town via Moçâmedes, Angola, using the Avro RJ85 ZS-SSH (msn 2285). The flight picked up passengers of RMS St Helena stranded on the island when St Helena suffered propeller damage.

On 14 October 2017, Airlink began a weekly service between Johannesburg, South Africa, and Saint Helena Airport using an Embraer 190-100IGW, the first scheduled airline service in Saint Helena's history. With 78 passengers aboard, the airliner arrived at Saint Helena Airport after a flight of about six hours from Johannesburg with a refuel stop at Windhoek.

In April 2020, UK charter airline Titan Airways became the first operator to land an Airbus airliner on St Helena, following the arrival of an A318. The narrowbody (G-EUNB) was chartered by the UK government to carry medical staff and 2.5 tonnes of "essential medical supplies" for the residents of its overseas territory.

The airport is situated such that at times serious wind shear makes it difficult to land from the north. It is safe to land from the other direction, but it is plagued by tailwinds, which increase landing ground speed, and thus imposes a weight restriction, which translates to fewer passengers. Nevertheless, only a few flights were delayed to next day during the first half-year. This happened a little more often during the second half-year during the local winter. Fog is a bigger problem than wind shear.

Due to the COVID-19 pandemic and the lockdown in South Africa, the commercial air service between South Africa and St Helena was suspended from 21 March 2020. Private and charter jets shall be accepted only with permission from the Governor. All arriving air passengers are required to quarantine in Bradley's Camp near the airport to reduce the risk of COVID-19 reaching the Island and spreading amongst the population.

There were a limited number of flights as of early March 2021, because of the restrictions imposed due to the pandemic. At that time, only a few types of non-Saint visitors were allowed to arrive on the island.

Land
A minibus offers a basic service to carry people around Saint Helena, with most services designed to take people into Jamestown for a few hours on weekdays to conduct their business. Car hire is available for visitors. There are also a number of taxi companies available including V2 Taxis and Crowie's Taxis.

Media and communications

Television was finally introduced in 1995, via a satellite receiver from South Africa, expanding from one channel to three quite soon. Mobile ("cell") phone service commenced in September 2015.

There are three active radio stations on Saint Helena and one company, Sure South Atlantic, provides "broadband, mobile phone, national & international telephone, public Internet and television re-broadcast services". The company's monopoly is based on a contract with the government that is in force until 31 December 2022.

A January 2021 report in a technology industry publication stated that the island has been relying on a "single 7.6-metre satellite dish to connect the island's residents to the rest of the world" and added that an undersea cable was being laid.

A news release issued some eighteen months earlier had notified islanders that the government had signed "a letter of intent to connect St Helena to the Equiano subsea cable project" to get "the first fibre optic connectivity". The release suggested that St Helena might get broadband service "as early as August 2021" if all went well with the installation project. The government believed that this option would provide the "most cost effective growth of bandwidth needs".

The January 2021 item in the industry magazine also stated that new telecom regulations were being drafted; there was a "possibility of issuing a license to a different provider after Sure's term expires".

Radio
The station presented news, features, and music in collaboration with its sister newspaper the St Helena Herald. It closed on 25 December 2012 to make way for a new three-channel FM service, also funded by St. Helena Government and run by the South Atlantic Media Services (SAMS), formerly St. Helena Broadcasting (Guarantee) Corporation.

SAMS provides two radio channels to St Helena. SAMS Radio 1 is a music and entertainment channel; SAMS Radio 2 is a relay of the BBC World Service. SAMS also produces a weekly newspaper, The Sentinel, and formerly a weekly TV news broadcast.

Saint FM provided a local radio service for the island which was also available on Internet radio and relayed in Ascension Island. The station was not government-funded. It was launched in January 2005 and closed on 21 December 2012. It broadcast news, features, and music in collaboration with its sister newspaper the St Helena Independent, which continues.

Saint FM Community Radio took over the radio channels vacated by Saint FM and launched on 10 March 2013. The station operates as a limited-by-guarantee company owned by its members, and is registered as a fund-raising association. Membership is open to everyone and grants access to a live audio stream.

As of October 2020, the Saint Helena Island Info website listed three active stations, two operated by South Atlantic Media Services: S.A.M.S. Radio 1 (news, features and entertainment), S.A.M.S. Radio 2 (relay of the BBC World Service) and the SaintFM Community Radio.

Occasional amateur radio operations also occur on the island. The ITU prefix used is ZD7.

Online
Saint Helena Island Info is an online resource featuring the history of St. Helena from its discovery to the present day, plus photographs and information about life on St. Helena today.

Saint Helena Government is the official mouthpiece of the island's governing body. It includes news, information for potential visitors and investors, as well as official press releases and pages from the major government departments.

Saint Helena Tourism is a website aimed at the tourist trade with advice on accommodation, transport, food and drink, events and the like.

Television
Sure South Atlantic Ltd (Sure) offers television for the island via 17 analogue terrestrial UHF channels, offering a mix of British, US, and South African programming. The channels are from DSTV and include Mnet, SuperSport, and BBC channels. The feed signal from MultiChoice DStv in South Africa is received by a satellite dish at Bryant's Beacon from Intelsat 20 and Intelsat 36 in the Ku band.

SAMS formerly produced a weekly TV news broadcast, Newsbyte, which was also published on YouTube.

Telecommunications
Sure provides the telecommunications service in the territory through a digital copper-based telephone network including ADSL broadband service. In August 2011 the first fibre-optic link was installed on the island, which connects the television reception antennas at Bryant's Beacon to the Cable & Wireless plc Technical Centre in the Briars.

A satellite ground station with a  satellite dish installed in 1989 at The Briars is the only international connection providing satellite links through Intelsat 707 to Ascension island and the United Kingdom. Since all international telephone and Internet communications are relying on this single satellite link, both Internet and telephone service are subject to Sun outages.

Saint Helena has the international calling code +290, which Tristan da Cunha has shared since 2006. Saint Helena telephone numbers changed from four to five digits on 1 October 2013 by being prefixed with the digit "2", i.e. 2xxxx, with the range 5xxxx being reserved for mobile numbering, and 8xxx being used for Tristan da Cunha numbers (these are still shown as four digits).

Mobile telephony started operating on the island by late 2015. A full set of services is available from Sure.

Sure South Atlantic has an exclusive public telecommunication licence until 31 December 2022. Considering the onset of new fibre capacity to the Island from 2022, and the new licence period, a consultation was undertaken which gathered public expectations of telecommunications and electronic communications post 2022. This was leading to a new Policy on Communications Networks and Services to be developed in 2020.

Internet
Saint Helena was granted the use of .sh as its own Internet country code top-level domain (ccTLD). This is formally shared with Ascension Island and Tristan da Cunha, British Overseas Territories. Registrations of internationalised domain names are also accepted under this TLD so, for example, the German federal state of Schleswig-Holstein uses the .sh domain for some quasi-governmental sites. In practice several sites dedicated to aspects of life on Saint Helena are run from elsewhere in the world, so they use other TLDs.

St Helena had a 10/3.6 Mbit/s Internet link via Intelsat 707 (deactivated January 2011) provided by Sure. Serving a population of more than 4,000, this single satellite link is considered inadequate in terms of bandwidth. As of December 2013 the total Internet bandwidth for the island was 40 Mbit/s download and 14.4 Mbit/s upload, respectively.

By September 2014, ADSL broadband service was provided with maximum speeds of up to 1,536 kbit/s downstream and 512 kbit/s upstream offered on contract levels from lite at £16 per month to gold+ at £190 per month. There were a few public wi-fi hotspots in Jamestown in 2010, which were being operated by Sure (formerly Cable & Wireless).

The South Atlantic Express, a  submarine communications cable connecting Africa to South America, as planned in 2012 by the undersea fibre optic provider eFive, was planned to pass St Helena relatively closely. At the time, there were no plans to land the cable and install a landing station ashore, which could supply St Helena's population with sufficient bandwidth to fully leverage the benefits of today's information society. In January 2012, a group of supporters petitioned the UK government to subsidise the cost of landing the cable at St Helena.
On 6 October 2012, eFive agreed to reroute the cable through St Helena after a successful lobbying campaign by A Human Right, a US NGO working on initiatives to ensure all people are connected to the Internet. In 2013, Islanders sought the assistance of the UK Department for International Development and Foreign and Commonwealth Office in funding the £10m required to bridge the connection from a local junction box on the cable to the island. The UK government announced in early 2013 that a review of the island's economy would be required before such funding would be agreed.

In 2017, St Helena Government (SHG) developed its Digital Strategy, drafted by the Assistant Chief Secretary at the time, Paul McGinnety. The Digital Strategy outlined intentions to connect to a Fibre Optic Cable to achieve developments in Education, Telemedicine and Digital Business.

In Brussels the following year, SHG UK Representative, Kedell Worboys, along with Director for Latin America & Caribbean, Directorate-General for International Cooperation and Development, Jolita Butkeviciene, signed a Financing Agreement for the Territorial Allocation of the 11th European Development Fund (EDF 11). As a result, €21.5 million was allocated to St Helena to support the delivery of the SHG Digital Strategy through the realisation of the submarine cable to enable faster and more reliable internet connectivity on the Island.

On Christmas Eve in 2019, SHG announced that they had signed a contract with Google to land a branch of the Equiano Cable, named after Olaudah Equiano, an African writer who had been enslaved as a child. The main trunk of the cable will connect South Africa with Portugal. The press release explained that the branch between the main trunk of the Equiano cable and the Island will be 1,140 km long and that the target is to deliver the cable and associated high-speed Internet to St Helena by early 2022; providing the cable laying, landing station and associated planning permissions and works to start the service proceed on time. The landing of the Fibre Optic Cable will help to develop the satellite ground station and remote work jobs, as was set out in St Helena's 2018 Sustainable Economic Development Plan. The Labour Market Strategy also set out the willingness to attract digital nomads to live and work on St Helena.

In July 2019, the government advised that it had signed "a letter of intent to connect St Helena to the Equiano subsea cable project" to get "the first fibre-optic connectivity", perhaps "as early as August 2021".

A report published by a technology industry magazine, in March 2020, discussed the "dissatisfaction of many on the island with the quality of service" and the cost. The article also warned that removing the monopoly from the current operator would be difficult and expensive. If the dispute between the government and Sure cannot be resolved, the article warns, "Helenians [sic] could see incredibly fast Internet speeds come to their shores—only to go nowhere once they arrive".

Satellite ground stations / Earth stations
In February 2018, the government of St Helena launched the project to attract operators of satellite ground stations to the island who would lease capacity on the planned submarine cable for backhauling and so contribute to the operational costs of the latter. Satellite ground stations on St Helena could support communications with satellites in low Earth orbit, including those in polar, equatorial and inclined orbit and with high-throughput satellites in medium Earth as well as Geostationary orbit.

In 2020, the Policy Statement on Licensing Permanent Earth Stations and Receive Only Earth Stations was endorsed by Executive Council.

Local newspapers
The island has two local newspapers, both of which are available online. The St Helena Independent has been published since November 2005. The Sentinel newspaper was introduced in 2012.

Culture and society

Education

The Education and Employment Directorate, formerly the Saint Helena Education Department, in 2000 had its head office in The Canister in Jamestown. Education is free and compulsory between the ages of five and 16. At the beginning of the academic year 2009–10, 230 students were enrolled in primary school and 286 in secondary school. The island has three primary schools for students of age four to 11: Harford, Pilling, and St Paul's.
 St Paul's Primary School in St Paul's, formerly St Paul's Middle School, has both first and middle levels as it was formed by a 1 August 2000 merger.  it has 134 students and serves, in addition to St Paul's, Bluehill, Gordons Post, New Ground, Sandy Bay, and Upper Half Tree Hollow. In 2002, in addition to St Paul's it served a portion of Half Tree Hollow as well as the communities of Blue Hill, Guinea Grass, Hunt's Bank, New Ground, Sandy Bay, Thompson's Hill, and Vaughn's.
 Harford Primary School in Longwood, with Governor James Harford as its namesake, opened as a senior school in 1957 and became Hardford Middle School in September 1988. It merged with Longwood First School in 2008. It also serves Alarm Forest and Levelwood.
 Pilling Primary School is in Jamestown. Occupying a former garrison, the school was established in 1941 and became Pilling Middle School in 1988. Jamestown First School, located next door to Pilling Middle, merged into it in May 2005 as a result of declining enrolment. The merged school initially used both buildings, but as the enrolment continued its decline, the ex-Jamestown First Building, constructed in 1959, was no longer in use after 2007. In addition to Jamestown it serves Alarm Forest, Briars, Lower Half Tree Hollow, Rupert's, and Sea View.  it had 126 students.
Prince Andrew School provides secondary education for students aged 11 to 18.

It formerly had separate first schools catering to younger students (ages 3 to 7 as of 2002):
 Half Tree Hollow First School, originally a primary school, opened as such in 1949 with its current name and year configuration in place since 1988. In addition to Half Tree Hollow it served Cleugh's Plain, New Ground, and Sapper Way.
 Jamestown First School, originally Jamestown Junior School, opened as such in 1959 with its current name and year configuration in place since 1988.
 Longwood First School, originally a primary school, opened in 1949 in a former mess hall for military officers that had been constructed in 1942; this building had an expansion in 1977, and there are four classrooms in a separate building that was built in 1958. Longwood became a "first school" in 1988.

The Education and Employment Directorate also offers programmes for students with special needs, vocational training, adult education, evening classes, and distance learning. The island has a public library (the oldest in the Southern Hemisphere, open since 1813) and a mobile library service which operates weekly in rural areas.

The English national curriculum is adapted for local use. A range of qualifications are offered—from GCSE, A/S and A2, to Level 3 Diplomas and Vocationally Recognised Qualifications (VRQs):

GCSEs
 Design and Technology
 ICT
 Business Studies

A/S & A2 and Level 3 Diploma
 Business Studies
 English
 English Literature
 Geography
 ICT
 Psychology
 Maths
 Accountancy

VRQ
 Building and Construction
 Automotive Studies

Saint Helena has no tertiary education. Scholarships are offered for students to study abroad. St Helena Community College (SHCC) has some vocational and professional education programmes available.

Sport

Historically, the St Helena Turf Club organised the island's first recorded sports events in 1818 with a series of horse races at Deadwood. Saint Helena has sent teams to a number of Commonwealth Games. Saint Helena is a member of the International Island Games Association. The Saint Helena cricket team made its debut in international cricket in Division Three of the African region of the World Cricket League in 2012. The Saint Helena football team first tournament was the 2019 Inter Games Football Tournament after which it was ranked tenth out of ten.

The Governor's Cup is a yacht race between Cape Town and Saint Helena island, held every two years in December and January.

In Jamestown a timed run takes place up Jacob's Ladder every year, with people coming from all over the world to take part.

Scouting and Girl Guiding

There are Scouting and Guiding Groups on Saint Helena and Ascension Island. Scouting was established on Saint Helena island in 1912. Lord and Lady Baden-Powell visited the Scouts on Saint Helena on the return from their 1937 tour of Africa. The visit is described in Lord Baden-Powell's book, titled African Adventures.

Cuisine
In 2017 Julia Buckley of The Independent wrote that due to the lack of nouvelle cuisine, the food is "[p]retty retro, at least by London standards." Fish cakes in a St Helena style, with egg binding and chilli, and a risotto with curry dish called pilau or plo, are what Buckley describes as "staple[s]". Most local recipes are variations of world dishes brought to the island by travellers.

Language
English is the official language. The local basilect is called Saint-speak or Saint English.

Notable people

Fernão Lopes (died 1545), Portuguese soldier, first-known permanent inhabitant of the island
John Doveton (1768 St Helena – 1847), East India Company military officer
Napoleon Bonaparte (1769–1821 St Helena), French Emperor, exiled 1815-1821.
Daniel Richard Caldwell (1816 St Helena – 1875), colonial official.
Saul Solomon (1817 St Helena – 1892), liberal politician of the British Cape Colony
François d'Orléans, Prince of Joinville (1818–1900) brought the remains of Napoleon to France 
William Bailey (1851 St Helena – 1896) trade unionist in GB and Primitive Methodist preacher.
Khalid bin Bargash (1874-1927), deposed Sultan of Zanzibar, exiled in St Helena in 1917
 Michel Dancoisne-Martineau (born 1965) the director of the French domains of Saint Helena
Belinda Bennett (born ca.1977 St Helena) a cruise ship captain from Saint Helena.
Julie Thomas (born ca.1980 St Helena) inaugural Chief Minister of Saint Helena

Notable creature 

 Jonathan, a Seychelles giant tortoise brought to Saint Helena in 1882, is the world's oldest-known living land animal. He celebrated his 190th birthday in 2022

Namesake
St Helena, a suburb of Melbourne, Victoria, Australia, was named after the island.

See also 

Lists of islands
Wildlife of Saint Helena, Ascension and Tristan da Cunha
Manatee of Helena
Outline of Saint Helena
Saint Helena Police Service
Healthcare in Saint Helena

References

Further reading 

 Aptroot, Andre. Lichens of St Helena, Pisces Publications, Newbury, UK, 2012, 
 Brooke, T. H., A History of the Island of St Helena from its Discovery by the Portuguese to the Year 1806, Printed for Black, Parry and Kingsbury, London, 1808
 Bruce, I. T., Thomas Buce: St Helena Postmaster and Stamp Designer, Thirty years of St Helena, Ascension and Tristan Philately, pp 7–10, 2006, 
 Cannan, Edward Churches of the South Atlantic Islands 1502–1991 
 Chaplin, Arnold, A St Helena's Who's Who or a Directory of the Island During the Captivity of Napoleon, published by the author in 1914. This has recently been republished under the title Napoleon’s Captivity on St Helena 1815–1821, Savannah Paperback Classics, 2002, 
 Clements, B.; "St Helena:South Atlantic Fortress"; Fort, (Fortress Study Group), 2007 (35), pp. 75–90
 Crallan, Hugh, Island of St Helena, Listing and Preservation of Buildings of Architectural and Historic Interest, 1974
 Cross, Tony St Helena including Ascension Island and Tristan Da Cunha 
 Dampier, William, Piracy, Turtles & Flying Foxes, 2007, Penguin Books, 2007, pp 99–104, 
 Darwin, Charles, Geological Observations on the Volcanic Islands, Chapter 4, Smith, Elder & Co., London, 1844.
 Denholm, Ken, South Atlantic Haven, a Maritime History for the Island of St Helena, published and printed by the Education Department of the Government of St Helena
 Duncan, Francis, A Description of the Island of St Helena Containing Observations on its Singular Structure and Formation and an Account of its Climate, Natural History, and Inhabitants, London, Printed For R Phillips, 6 Bridge Street, Blackfriars, 1805
 Eriksen, Ronnie, St Helena Lifeline, Mallet & Bell Publications, Norfolk, 1994, 
 Evans, Dorothy, Schooling in the South Atlantic Islands 1661–1992, Anthony Nelson, 1994, 
 George, Barbara B. St Helena — the Chinese Connection (2002) 
 Gosse, Philip Saint Helena, 1502–1938 
 Hakluyt, The Principal Navigations Voyages Traffiques & Discoveries of the English Nation, from the Prosperous Voyage of M. Thomas Candish esquire into the South Sea, and so around about the circumference of the whole earth, begun in the yere 1586, and finished 1588, 1598–1600, Volume XI.
 Hibbert, Edward, St Helena Postal History and Stamps, Robson Lowe Limited, London, 1979
 Hearl, Trevor W., St Helena Britannica: Studies in South Atlantic Island History (ed. A.H. Schulenburg), Friends of St Helena, London, 2013
 Holmes, Rachel, Scanty Particulars: The Scandalous Life and Astonishing Secret of James Barry, Queen Victoria's Most Eminent Military Doctor, Viking Press, 2002, 
 Jackson, E. L. St Helena: The Historic Island, Ward, Lock & Co, London, 1903
 Janisch, Hudson Ralph, Extracts from the St Helena Records, Printed and Published at the "Guardian" Office by Benjamin Grant, St Helena, 1885
 Keneally, Tom, Napoleon's Last Island, Penguin Random House Australia, 2015
 Kitching, G. C., A Handbook of St Helena Including a short History of the island Under the Crown
 Lambdon, Phil. Flowering plants and ferns of St Helena, Pisces Publications, Newbury, UK, 2012, 
 Melliss, John C. M., St Helena: A Physical, Historical and Topographical Description of the Island Including Geology, Fauna, Flora and Meteorology, L. Reeve & Co, London, 1875
 Schulenburg, A. H., 'St Helena Historiography, Philately, and the "Castella" Controversy', South Atlantic Chronicle: The Journal of the St Helena, Ascension and Tristan da Cunha Philatelic Society, Vol. XXIII, No.3, pp. 3–6, 1999
 Schulenburg, A.H., '"Island of the Blessed": Eden, Arcadia and the Picturesque in the Textualizing of St Helena', Journal of Historical Geography, Vol.29, No.4 (2003), pp. 535–53
 Schulenburg, A.H., 'St Helena: British Local History in the Context of Empire', The Local Historian, Vol.28, No.2 (1998), pp. 108–122
 Shine, Ian, Serendipity in St Helena, a Genetical and Medical Study of an isolated Community, Pergamon Press, Oxford, 1970 
 Smallman, David L., Quincentenary, a Story of St Helena, 1502–2002 
 Van Linschoten, Iohn Huighen, His Discours of Voyages into ye Easte & West Indies, Wolfe, London, 1598
 Weider, Ben & Hapgood, David The Murder of Napoleon (1999) 
 Wigginton, Martin. Mosses and liverworts of St Helena, Pisces Publications, Newbury, UK, 2012, 

 Media
  - Deutsche Welle - 28 October 2017

External links

 The Official Government Website of Saint Helena
 The Official Website for St Helena Tourism
 The Official Website of the Saint Helena Napoleonic Heritage Ltd
 Saint Helena Island Information website
 Radio Saint FM (live broadcasting from Saint Helena)

 Saint Helena Travel Guide from Travellerspoint.
 BBC News: Life on one of the world's most remote islands
 
 Seale, Robert F. (1834) The geognosy of the island St. Helena, illustrated in a series of views, plans and sections. London: Achermann and Co. – digital facsimile from the Linda Hall Library
 
 Isolated Islands: St. Helena  (2014), Globe Trekker (Travel documentary)

 
Islands of Saint Helena, Ascension and Tristan da Cunha
Islands of the South Atlantic Ocean
 
West Africa
Islands of British Overseas Territories
States and territories established in 1659
1659 establishments in Africa
1659 establishments in the British Empire
Former British colonies and protectorates in Africa
English-speaking countries and territories
Mid-Atlantic Ridge